Mount Baldy Zen Center (MBZC) is a Rinzai Zen monastery of the Nyorai-nyokyo sect, located in the San Gabriel Mountains of the Angeles National Forest region on  and founded in 1971 by Kyozan Joshu Sasaki. The monastery — once a Boy Scout camp — became famous when  musician Leonard Cohen joined the community in 1994. The monastery served as residence for Sasaki, and is the training center for monastics in his lineage. Other centers in Sasaki's network, including Rinzai-ji, offer the opportunity to practice Zen to laypeople in the lineage. Sasaki died in 2014 at the age of 107.

Gallery

See also 
 Buddhism in the United States
 Timeline of Zen Buddhism in the United States

Notes

References

External links 

 Image of Zen Buddhist monks and students walking to lunch at Mt. Baldy Zen Center, California,1973. Los Angeles Times Photographic Archive (Collection 1429). UCLA Library Special Collections, Charles E. Young Research Library, University of California, Los Angeles.

Zen centers in California
Buddhist temples in California
Myoshin-ji temples
Religious buildings and structures in Los Angeles County, California
San Gabriel Mountains
Religious organizations established in 1971
1971 establishments in California